Cedar is a city in Smith County, Kansas, United States.  As of the 2020 census, the population of the city was 11.

History
Cedar was a station and shipping point on the Missouri Pacific Railroad.

The first post office in Cedar was established in 1871, but it was called Cedarville until 1906.

Geography
Cedar is located at  (39.656711, -98.940389).

Demographics

2010 census
As of the census of 2010, there were 14 people, 8 households, and 5 families residing in the city. The racial makeup of the city was 100.0% White.

There were 8 households, of which 12.5% had children under the age of 18 living with them, 62.5% were married couples living together, and 37.5% were non-families. 37.5% of all households were made up of individuals, and 25% had someone living alone who was 65 years of age or older. The average household size was 1.75 and the average family size was 2.20.

The median age in the city was 71.3 years. 7.1% of residents were under the age of 18; 0% were between the ages of 18 and 24; 7.1% were from 25 to 44; 14.2% were from 45 to 64; and 71.4% were 65 years of age or older. The gender makeup of the city was 50.0% male and 50.0% female.

2000 census
As of the census of 2000, there were 26 people, 10 households, and 9 families residing in the city. The racial makeup of the city was 100.00% White.

There were 10 households, out of which 40.0% had children under the age of 18 living with them, 80.0% were married couples living together, and 10.0% were non-families. 10.0% of all households were made up of individuals, and 10.0% had someone living alone who was 65 years of age or older.  The average household size was 2.60 and the average family size was 2.67.

In the city, the population was spread out, with 23.1% under the age of 18, 3.8% from 18 to 24, 30.8% from 25 to 44, 7.7% from 45 to 64, and 34.6% who were 65 years of age or older.  The median age was 40 years. For every 100 females, there were 160.0 males.  For every 100 females age 18 and over, there were 100.0 males.

The median income for a household in the city was $31,875, and the median income for a family was $30,625. Males had a median income of $32,500 versus $8,750 for females. The per capita income for the city was $13,770.  None of the population and none of the families were below the poverty line.

Government
The Cedar government consists of a mayor and five council members.  The council meets the 1st Monday of each month at 7 pm.

Education
The community is served by Smith Center USD 237 public school district.

References

Further reading

External links

 Cedar – Directory of Public Officials
 Cedar city map, KDOT

Cities in Kansas
Cities in Smith County, Kansas